Cartersville Bridge is a historic bridge located near Cartersville, Cumberland County, Virginia. The original bridge was constructed in 1822, and its five stone piers of rough cut ashlar and rubble and two stone abutments remain. Atop them is a superstructure constructed in 1883-84 of heavy timber members with cast-iron connections arranged to form a truss configuration based on the Pratt truss.

The bridge was listed on the National Register of Historic Places in 1972.

See also
List of bridges documented by the Historic American Engineering Record in Virginia
List of bridges on the National Register of Historic Places in Virginia

References

External links

Historic American Engineering Record in Virginia
Road bridges on the National Register of Historic Places in Virginia
Bridges completed in 1822
Buildings and structures in Cumberland County, Virginia
Buildings and structures in Goochland County, Virginia
National Register of Historic Places in Cumberland County, Virginia
National Register of Historic Places in Goochland County, Virginia
1822 establishments in Virginia
Pratt truss bridges in the United States
Wooden bridges in Virginia